Across the Acheron is the second full-length studio album by the Finnish melodic death metal band Rifftera, released on 18 January 2019 through Inverse Records. It is the first album to feature drummer Ville Härkönen.

Track listing 
All lyrics written by Janne Hietala.

Personnel

Rifftera 
 Janne Hietala – guitar, harsh vocals
 Mikko Kuoppamaa – guitar, clean vocals
 Antti Pöntinen – keyboards
 Jupe Karhu – bass
 Ville Härkönen – drums

Production 
 Janne Hietala – production, engineering, recording, mixing
 Mikko Kuoppamaa – additional recording
 Sami Koivisto – drum engineering & recording
 Mika Jussila - mastering
 Petri Lampela – cover art
 Heidi Järvi – photography

References

External links 
 Across the Acheron (album) at Encyclopaedia Metallum
 Rifftera - Eye of the Storm video at YouTube
 Rifftera - Cutthroat Game video at YouTube

2019 albums
Rifftera albums